The Slănic is a right tributary of the Bratia in Romania. It flows into the Bratia in Vlădești.

References

Rivers of Romania
Rivers of Argeș County